Maksim Sergeyevich Kazankov (born 20 March 1987) is a Russian professional football player. He plays as an attacking midfielder or right midfielder for FC Sakhalinets Moscow. He also holds Turkmenistani citizenship.

Club career
Born in Ashgabat, Turkmen SSR, Soviet Union. His father  is also a former Soviet footballer. His father is Russian, mother is Azerbaijani.

Kazankov played for FC Aşgabat from 2006 year.

He played for various Russian teams: FC Gazovik Orenburg (2008–2009), FC Dynamo Saint Petersburg (2010), Torpedo-ZIL (2010, 2 circle), FC Sokol Saratov (2011).

In February 2012 Kazankov moved to the Uzbek League Lokomotiv Tashkent FK. In March, made his debut in the match against FC Shurtan Guzar, playing 55 minutes. In the following rounds entrenched in the main part of the club. By the end of the season spent 21 games and scored two goals. Became the bronze medalist of Uzbekistan Championship 2012.

On 29 December 2012 it became known about the transition to FC Zenit Penza. But in the summer he left the club and joined the freshman composition of FC Domodedovo Moscow. In January 2015 on loan to FC Saturn Ramenskoye.

National  team 
As a graduate of Turkmen football never played for the national team of Turkmenistan. On October 11, 2007, he was in the application for the 2010 World Cup qualifier against Cambodia (1: 0), but played on the bench

Honours
Ýokary Liga:
Champion: 2008

Career statistics

Notes

References

External links
 FC Saturn Ramenskoye profile
 
 Maxim Kazankov – PFC Sokol
 Maxim Kazankov – Soccer.ru
 Maxim kazankov – Sports.ru
 

1987 births
Living people
Turkmenistan footballers
Russian footballers
Association football midfielders
Sportspeople from Ashgabat
Turkmenistan people of Russian descent
FC Sokol Saratov players
FC Saturn Ramenskoye players
FC Luch Vladivostok players
FC SKA-Khabarovsk players
FC Orenburg players
FC Dynamo Saint Petersburg players
FC Zenit-Izhevsk players
FC Tom Tomsk players
FC Tyumen players
FC Spartak Kostroma players
Russian Premier League players
Russian First League players
Russian Second League players
Russian expatriate footballers
Expatriate footballers in Uzbekistan
Russian expatriate sportspeople in Uzbekistan